Australia have competed in international rugby union matches since 1889. They compete in the annual Rugby Championship series and have appeared at every Rugby World Cup, winning the tournament in 1991 and 1999 and finishing second in 2003 and 2015. The records listed below only include performances in Test matches. The top five are listed in each category (except when there is a tie for the last place among the five, when all the tied record holders are noted).

Team records

Greatest winning margins

Greatest losing margins

Individual records (career)

Individual records (single match)

See also

 List of Australia national rugby union team test match results

Notes

References

Australian records
Australia
Records